Stoszowice  is a village in Ząbkowice Śląskie County, Lower Silesian Voivodeship, in south-western Poland. It is the seat of the administrative district (gmina) called Gmina Stoszowice. Prior to 1945 it was in Germany.

The village has a population of 1,100.

Notable residents
 Moritz von Strachwitz (1822–1847) German poet

References

Villages in Ząbkowice Śląskie County